USS Emerald has been the name of more than one United States Navy ship, and may refer to:

 , a ferry boat in service from 1864 and 1883
 , a patrol vessel in service from 1917 to 1918
 , a coastal minesweeper in commission from 1940 to 1942

United States Navy ship names